Luke John Muldowney (born 31 July 1986) is an English semi-professional footballer who is first team coach at Potters Bar Town. A midfielder, Muldowney began his career at Brentford, for whom he made one professional appearance before dropping into non-League football upon his release in 2005. He spent six years as a player, captain and latterly manager at non-League club Egham Town.

Playing career

Brentford 
Palmer began his career as a youth at Brentford and embarked on a scholarship at the beginning of the 2002–03 season. His maiden call into the first team squad came for a Football League Trophy first round match against Milton Keynes Dons on 28 September 2004. Muldowney made his only appearance for the club as a substitute for Stephen Hunt at half time during the 3–0 defeat. Muldowney was called into the first team squad again on 30 October and was an unused substitute for a 1–0 defeat to Tranmere Rovers. It was Muldowney's final involvement for the first team and he was released at the end of the 2004–05 season.

Kingstonian (loan) 
Muldowney joined Isthmian League Premier Division club Kingstonian on a work experience loan in December 2004. He made six appearances for the club before returning to Griffin Park in March.

Staines Town (loan and permanent signing) 
In March 2005, Muldowney joined Isthmian League Premier Division club Staines Town on loan until the end of the 2004–05 season. He made just one appearance before returning to Brentford at the end of the season. After an unsuccessful trial at Championship club Reading, Muldowney signed for Staines permanently during the 2005 off-season, but managed only eight appearances before departing in October 2005.

Chertsey Town 
Muldowney joined Isthmian League Second Division club Chertsey Town in October 2005. He made 18 appearances during the 2005–06 season. With the Curfews reassigned to the Combined Counties League Premier Division for the 2006–07 season, Muldowney was a virtual ever-present, making 49 appearances and scoring 9 goals.

Wealdstone 
Muldowney signed for Isthmian League Premier Division club Wealdstone in July 2007. He made 22 appearances during the 2007–08 season.

Return to Chertsey Town (loan and permanent signing) 
Muldowney returned to Chertsey Town on loan in December 2007, a move which was later turned into a permanent signing. He made 22 appearances during the 2007–08 season and scored no goals. A broken toe disrupted the second half of Muldowney's 2008–09 season and he was denied the chance to win the first silverware of his career after Chertsey were removed from the Premier Challenge Cup Final, for fielding an ineligible player in their semi-final win over Worcester Park. Muldowney made 41 appearances during the 2008–09 season and scored four goals.

Egham Town 
Muldowney signed for Combined Counties League Premier Division club Egham Town during the 2009 off-season. He had a first successful first season with Egham, making 41 appearances and scoring three goals as the Sarnies achieved a fourth-place finish in the league. After a mediocre 2010–11 season which saw the Sarnies finish 13th (though Muldowney improved his goal tally to four), they made a challenge for the title in the 2011–12 season, with Muldowney making 39 appearances. Everything came right for the club in the 2012–13 season, with Muldowney making 45 appearances and scoring five goals on the way to the Combined Counties League Premier Division title. The winning goal and the man of the match award in the final day victory over Bedfont Sports capped Muldowney's season. He made 40 appearances and scored two goals during a mid-table 2013–14 season, before dropping to 24 appearances and one goal in 2014–15 and departing in February 2015.

Hanworth Villa 
Muldowney joined Combined Counties League Premier Division club Hanworth Villa during the 2014–15 season. He played through to the 2017–18 season and was a part of the club's 2018 Middlesex Senior Charity Cup Final-winning squad.

Abbey Rangers 
Muldowney made 8 appearances for Combined Counties League Premier Division club Abbey Rangers during the 2018–19 season.

Managerial and coaching career

Egham Town 
In October 2014, Muldowney was named as player-manager of Southern League First Division Central club Egham Town, with Richie Byrne as his assistant. He remained in charge until being replaced by Koo Dumbuya in February 2015.

Hanworth Villa 
Muldowney was named as player-assistant manager at Combined Counties League Premier Division club Hanworth Villa in 2015. He and the entire management team stepped down after the club's Middlesex Senior Charity Cup win at the end of the 2015–16 season.

Potters Bar Town 
During the 2019 off-season, Muldowney was appointed as first team coach at Isthmian League Premier Division club Potters Bar Town.

Sunday League 
Muldowney linked up with former Brentford youth teammates Mark Scotchford, Barry Marchena and brother Charlie Muldowney to make seven appearances for West Middlesex Sunday Football League club Green Man Rangers in 2011.

Personal life 
Muldowney's brother Jamie and cousin Charlie were also products of the Centre of Excellence at Brentford.

Honours 
Egham Town
Combined Counties League Premier Division: 2012–13

Hanworth Villa

 Middlesex Senior Charity Cup: 2017–18

Career statistics

References

External links

Luke Muldowney at pitchero.com

1986 births
Living people
English footballers
Association football midfielders
Brentford F.C. players
Kingstonian F.C. players
Staines Town F.C. players
Chertsey Town F.C. players
Wealdstone F.C. players
Egham Town F.C. players
Hanworth Villa F.C. players
Isthmian League players
Southern Football League managers
Southern Football League players
English football managers
Egham Town F.C. managers